Alejandro Pérez Lugín (1870–1926) was a Spanish writer and film director. He attended university in Santiago de Compostela, and a number of his books have Galician themes. His 1921 novel Currito of the Cross, which uses bullfighting as its backdrop, has been adapted into film four times. Pérez Lugin himself directed successful film adaptations of two of his works during the silent era.

Works

Literature

 La Casa de la Troya (1915), Fastenrath Award
 Currito de la Cruz (1921)
 La corredoira y la rúa (1922)
 Arminda Moscoso (Posthumous, 1928)
 La virgen del Rocío ya entró en Triana (Posthumous, 1929)

Selected filmography as director
 The House of Troy (1925)
 Currito of the Cross (1926)

References

Bibliography 
 Labanyi, Jo & Pavlović, Tatjana. A Companion to Spanish Cinema. John Wiley & Sons, 2012.

External links 
 
 

1870 births
1926 deaths
Spanish film directors
Spanish male writers
Male screenwriters
People from Madrid
20th-century Spanish screenwriters
20th-century Spanish male writers